Structured Financial Messaging System (SFMS) is a secure messaging standard developed to serve as a platform for intra-bank and inter-bank applications. It is an Indian standard similar to SWIFT (Society for World-wide Interbank Financial Telecommunications) which is the international messaging system used for financial messaging globally.

SFMS can be used for secure communication within the bank and between banks. The SFMS was launched on December 14, 2001 at IDRBT. It allows the definition of message structures, message formats, and authorization of the same for usage by the financial community. SFMS has a number of features and it is a modularized and web enabled software, with a flexible architecture facilitating centralized or distributed deployment. The access control is through Smart Card based user access and messages are secured by means of standard encryption and authentication services conforming to ISO standards.

The intra-bank part of SFMS is used by banks to take full advantage of the secure messaging facility it provides. The inter-bank messaging part is used by applications like electronic funds transfer (EFT), real time gross settlement systems (RTGS), delivery versus payments (DVP), centralized funds management systems (CFMS) and others. The SFMS provides  application program interfaces (APIs), which can be used to integrate existing and future applications with the SFMS. Several banks have integrated it with their core or centralized banking software.

The Indian Financial Technology and Allied Services (IFTAS)

With a view to provide focused attention and enable development of techno-banking in the country, the institute has promoted a new Section 8 company named The Indian Financial Technology and Allied Services (IFTAS). Headquartered in Mumbai, the mandate of the IFTAS is to provide IT-related services to the RBI, banks and other financial institutions.

Services like Indian Financial Network (INFINET), Structured Financial Messaging System (SFMS) and the Indian Banking Community Cloud (IBCC) have been handed over to IFTAS with effect from April 1, 2016.

References

Banking in India
Real-time gross settlement
Payment networks